is a Japanese singer, songwriter, producer and CEO of Tokyo Recordings. He is responsible for producing songs for acts like Wednesday Campanella, Kou Shibasaki, and other famous acts. His music combines musical elements of the R&B, PBR&B, Electronic and experimental tones genres. In 2018, it was revealed that he would make his solo debut as a singer and songwriter under Sony Music's Epic Records label. The album is co-produced by famed Japanese American singer-songwriter Hikaru Utada.

History 

Obukuro's musical career started in 2013, when he formed the duo N.O.R.K. with Ray Kunimoto while they were university students. In the next year, they released the EP ASDR, which consists of PBR&B and experimental electronica sounds. After the duo parted ways, Obukuro decided to launch his own indie label, Tokyo Recordings.

In September 2016, Obukuro gained fame when J-pop singer-songwriter Hikaru Utada released her sixth Japanese album, Fantôme. His vocals are featured in track 6, Tomodachi, an R&B song. He performed with Utada in NHK the song, making it his television debut.

In January 2018, Obukuro announced his major debut under Epic Records, with his debut single featuring Utada. The song, called "Lonely One", was released in streaming services on January 17, 2018. His debut album, Bunriha no Natsu, was released in April 2018.

Discography

Albums

Studio albums

Singles

As lead artist

Promotional singles

Music videos

Other appearances

Writing and/or produced credits

Tours 
Nariaki Obukuro Oneman Live Fall (2018)

Awards and nominations

Notes

References 

1991 births
Living people
Japanese male singer-songwriters
Japanese singer-songwriters
Japanese rhythm and blues singers
Epic Records artists
Contemporary R&B singers
Rikkyo University alumni
21st-century Japanese singers
21st-century Japanese male singers